Alma Luz Villanueva (born October 4, 1944 in Lompoc, California) is an American poet, short story writer, and novelist.

Life
Her Mexican grandfather edited a newspaper in Hermosillo, Mexico, and was a published poet. Her maternal grandmother, a Yaqui Indian curandera/healer (as was her mother) from Sonora, raised her in the Mission District of San Francisco.

She taught at University of California Santa Cruz, Cabrillo College, Naropa Institute, Mesa College, University of California, San Diego, Stanford University, Pacific University, and Antioch University Los Angeles.
She lives in San Miguel de Allende, Mexico.

Awards
 1989 American Book Award for the novel The Ultraviolet Sky
 PEN Oakland fiction award, 1994, for the novel Naked Ladies
 Latino Literature Prize, New York, 1994, for poetry, Planet
 The Best American Poetry, 1996, for poem, “Crazy Courage”
 1976-1977 Chicano/Latino Literary Prize

Works
Song of the Golden Scorpion. Wings Press. 2013. 

 The Ultraviolet Sky, republished with Doubleday, 1993. 
 
 Life Span (Place of Herons Press, 1985)
 Blood Root (Blue Heron Press, 1977)

Anthologies
Terry Beers, ed (2012). "Califlora, A Literary Field Guide." Excerpt from novel, "Luna's California Poppies." Heyday Books. 
Robert Shapart, James Thomas, Ray Gonzalez, eds (2010). "Sudden Fiction Latino." Short story, from book, "Weeping Woman, La Llorona," "People of the Dog." W.W. Norton. 
J. Sterling Warner, Judith Hillard, eds (2009). "Visions Across the Americas: Short Essays for Composition." Wadsworth Press. 
Jose Gurpegui, ed (2009). Camino Real. Universidad de Alcala- Madrid, Spain. ISSN 1889-5611
 "Pembroke Magazine, Number 40" (University of North Carolina, 2008)
  Story from "Weeping Woman, La Llorona."

 
 Susan Koppelman, ed (2003). Between Mothers and Daughters: Stories Across Generations. The Feminist Press. 
 

 
 

 
 Burleigh Muten, ed (1999). Her Words: Anthology of Poetry About The Great Goddess. Shambhala. 

 Burleigh Muten, ed (1997). Return of The Great Goddess. Stewart, Tabori, Chang. 
 
 
 

 
 
    (reprint 2008)
 
 Janine Canan, ed (1989). She Rises Like The Sun: Invocations of the Goddess by Contemporary American Women. Crossing Press. 
 
  (reprint HarperPerennial, August 1993)

References

External links
 
 Author's blog on Blogspot
 POETRY: ALMA LUZ VILLANUEVA
 mandalapress.com blog
 Alma Luz Villanueva
 
 

1944 births
American women short story writers
American short story writers
Living people
American writers of Mexican descent
University of California, Santa Cruz faculty
Pacific University faculty
Antioch University faculty
Naropa University faculty
Stanford University faculty
University of California, San Diego faculty
American women poets
American women dramatists and playwrights
PEN Oakland/Josephine Miles Literary Award winners
American Book Award winners
American women academics
21st-century American women